Bernardo Paret (March 14, 1937 – April 3, 1962), known as Benny Paret or Benny "Kid" Paret, was a Cuban welterweight boxer who won the World Welterweight Championship twice in the early 1960s.

Paret's death occurred 10 days after injuries sustained in a March 24, 1962, title defense against Emile Griffith, televised live and seen by millions on ABC's Fight of the Week. Paret had a lifetime record of 35 wins (10 knockouts), 12 losses and 3 draws.

Boxing career
Paret won the welterweight title for the first time on May 27, 1960, by defeating Don Jordan. In his first defense of the title, Emile Griffith knocked him out in the thirteenth round on April 1, 1961. Paret recaptured the crown on September 30, 1961, in a split-decision over Griffith. Barely two months later, Paret took on middleweight champion Gene Fullmer and was knocked out in the tenth round, being behind on all three judges' scorecards.

Last fight and death

Although Paret had been battered in the two fights with Griffith and the fight with Fullmer, he decided that he would defend his title against Griffith three months after the Fullmer fight. Paret–Griffith III was booked for Madison Square Garden on Saturday, March 24, 1962, and was televised live by ABC. In round six, Paret nearly knocked out Griffith with a multi-punch combination, but Griffith was saved by the bell.

In the twelfth round of the fight, Don Dunphy, who was calling the bout for ABC, remarked, "This is probably the tamest round of the entire fight." Seconds later, Griffith backed Paret into the corner before he unleashed a massive flurry of punches to the champion's head.

It quickly became apparent that Paret was dazed by the initial shots and could not defend himself, but referee Ruby Goldstein allowed Griffith to continue his assault. Finally, after 29 consecutive punches, which knocked Paret through the ropes at one point, Goldstein stepped in and called a halt to the bout.

Paret collapsed in the corner from the barrage of punches (initially thought to be from exhaustion), fell into a coma, and died ten days later at Roosevelt Hospital in Manhattan from massive brain hemorrhaging. Paret was buried at Saint Raymond's Cemetery in the borough of the Bronx in New York City.

The last fight between Paret and Griffith was the subject of many controversies. It is theorized that one of the reasons Paret died was that he was vulnerable due to the beatings he took in his previous three fights, all of which happened within twelve months of each other. New York State boxing authorities were criticized for giving Paret clearance to fight just several months after the Fullmer fight. The actions of Paret at the weigh-in before his final fight have come under scrutiny. It is alleged that Paret taunted Griffith by calling him maricón (Spanish slang for "faggot").

Griffith wanted to fight Paret on the spot but was restrained. Griffith would come out as bisexual in his later years, but in 1962 allegations of homosexuality were considered fatal to an athlete's career and a particularly grievous insult in the culture both fighters came from. The referee Ruby Goldstein, a respected veteran, came under criticism for not stopping the fight sooner. It has been argued that Goldstein hesitated because of Paret's reputation of feigning injury and Griffith's reputation as a poor finisher.

Another theory is that Goldstein was afraid that Paret's supporters would riot. The incident, combined with the death of Davey Moore a year later for a different injury in the ring, would cause debate as to whether boxing should be considered a sport. Boxing would not be televised on a regular basis again until the 1970s.

The fight also marked the end of Goldstein's long and respected career as a referee, as he was unable to find work after that. The fight was the centerpiece of a 2005 documentary entitled Ring of Fire: The Emile Griffith Story. At the end of the documentary, Griffith, who had harbored guilt over the incident over the years, is introduced to Paret's son. The son embraced Griffith and told him he was forgiven.

In popular culture
Paret's death was chronicled in a 1962 protest song by folk singer Gil Turner. The song, "Benny 'Kid' Paret", was published in Broadside magazine that same month and was recorded later in the year by Turner's group, The New World Singers, for the 1963 Folkways album Broadside Ballads, Vol. 1.

A 1962 poem by Australian ex-boxer Merv Lilley urged us to remember Benny Paret "when they're lacing leather on."

The emotive poem "Muerte en el Ring" ("Death in the Ring") by Afro-Peruvian poet Nicomedes Santa Cruz recounts Paret's life to the moment of his last breath.

A semifictionalized story of the fight was told live by radio dramatist Joe Frank in the 1978 program "80 Yard Run" on WBAI in New York and replayed several times subsequently on NPR. In it, Frank cast Griffith rather than Paret as the defending champion and makes no mention of Paret's recent fights or his prior history with Griffith. In the dramatized version, Griffith dominates the fight from the beginning, with the fight ending in the middle rounds and Paret dying later that night.

Paret is also one of many boxers named in the lyrics of Sun Kil Moon's 2003 album Ghosts of the Great Highway. The album builds several songs around the stories of boxers who died early deaths.

The story of Emile Griffith and Paret's death has been turned into an Opera in Jazz, Champion. It premiered on the campus of Webster University in Webster Groves, Missouri, on June 15, 2013. The opera was written by composer Terence Blanchard, with a libretto by playwright Michael Cristofer, who went on to develop the stage play "Man in the Ring" on the same subject. The play premiered at the Court Theatre in Chicago in 2016.

Professional boxing record

See also
Kim Duk-koo
List of welterweight boxing champions

References

External links
 
 

https://boxrec.com/media/index.php/National_Boxing_Association%27s_Quarterly_Ratings:_1960
https://boxrec.com/media/index.php/National_Boxing_Association%27s_Quarterly_Ratings:_1961
https://boxrec.com/media/index.php/National_Boxing_Association%27s_Quarterly_Ratings:_1962

1937 births
1962 deaths
People from Santa Clara, Cuba
American Roman Catholics
Welterweight boxers
Deaths due to injuries sustained in boxing
Sports deaths in New York (state)
Filmed deaths in sports
Cuban male boxers
Burials at Saint Raymond's Cemetery (Bronx)
Deaths from cerebrovascular disease